The County of Polwarth is one of the 37 counties of Victoria which are part of the cadastral divisions of Australia, used for land titles. The county is in the Western District of Victoria and includes the Cape Otway area, bounded by the Gellibrand River in the west and the Anglesea River and Barwon River in the east, in the north by a line from Winchelsea, through Colac to Larpent, and by Bass Strait to the south.  The largest town is Colac. The county was proclaimed in 1849.

Parishes 
Parishes within the county:
Aire   
Angahook 
Bambra 
Barongarook  
Barramunga 
Barwon Downs  
Barwongemoong  
Birregurra (part in the County of Grenville) 
Boonah 
Colac 
Elliminyt
Gerangamete
Irrewarra 
Irrewillipe 
Kaanglang 
Krambruk
La Trobe (part in the County of Heytesbury)
Lorne
Moomowroong  
Moorbanool 
Murroon  
Nalangil  
Natte Murrang
Newlingrook  
Olangolah 
Otway  
Pirron Yaloak
Wangerrip  
Warrion (part in the County of Grenville)  
Weeaproinah  
Wensleydale   
Whoorel
Wongarra
Wyelangta
Yan Yan Gourt  
Yaugher  
Yeo

References

External links
Research aids, Victoria 1910
 Map of the counties of Talbot, Dalhousie, Anglesey, Bourke, Grenville, Grant, Mornington, Polwarth / John Sands

Counties of Victoria (Australia)
Barwon South West (region)
Otway Ranges